The Lee–Metford rifle (a.k.a. Magazine Lee–Metford, abbreviated MLM) was a bolt-action British army service rifle, combining James Paris Lee's rear-locking bolt system and detachable magazine with an innovative seven groove rifled barrel designed by William Ellis Metford. It replaced the Martini–Henry rifle in 1888, following nine years of development and trials, but remained in service for only a short time until replaced by the similar Lee–Enfield.

Design

Lee's bolt action mechanism was a great improvement over other designs of the day:

- The rear-mounted lugs placed the operating handle much closer to the rifleman, over the trigger. This made it much quicker to operate than other, forward-mounted lug designs which forced the rifleman to move his hand forward to operate the bolt. It also enabled the rifleman to operate the trigger with his middle finger while still holding the bolt between thumb and index finger.

- The bolt's distance of travel was identical with the length of the cartridge, whereas in forward mounted lug designs bolt travel was cartridge length plus lug length. This also meant the firer did not have to lift his face out of the way when drawing back the bolt.

- The bolt lift was 60 degrees compared to the 90 degree rotation of some French and Mauser-style actions, both speedier and also meaning the rifleman did not lose the sight picture when the bolt handle was in the open position.

In addition Lee introduced a superior detachable box magazine to replace the integral magazines in use with most repeaters, and this magazine offered greater capacity than the competing Mannlicher design. Metford's polygonal rifling was  adopted to reduce fouling from powder residue building up in the barrel, and to make cleaning easier.

In spite of its many advantageous features, the Lee–Metford was something of an anachronism, due to its use of a black powder–loaded cartridge. By the time of the rifle's introduction, rifle design had moved on to using small-calibre smokeless powder cartridges, which allowed bullets to be propelled at much higher velocities without as much smoke or residue. The .303 ammunition designed for the rifle was in fact originally intended to be loaded with a smokeless propellant, but as a result of protracted development, selection of a smokeless propellant was delayed, forcing the British to rely on black powder in the interim. By the time Cordite cartridges were available, it was found that they were wholly unsuited for use with the shallow Metford rifling, which would wear out and render barrels unusable after approximately 6,000 rounds, compared to the 10,000 rounds that the deeper, square-cut Enfield rifling pattern rifles could deliver. The Lee rifles fitted with Enfield barrels became known as Lee Enfields.
Regardless of the shortfalls brought about by the use of black powder, the Lee–Metford went through several revisions during its short service life, with the principal changes being to the magazine (from eight-round single stack to ten-round staggered), sights, and safety. Starting in 1895, the Lee–Metford started to be phased out in favor of the Lee–Enfield for the reasons outlined above, involving a change to Enfield barrels and sights adjusted for the flatter trajectory enabled by the smokeless propellant.

Replacement
Replacement of the Lee–Metford rifles took several years to achieve, and they were still in service in some units during the Second Boer War in 1899. Nonetheless, captured Lee–Metford rifles became the primary weapon for the Boers too when their Mauser ammunition ran out.

The British considered an entirely new rifle, the Pattern 1913 Enfield, based upon a modified Mauser design, but its development was cut short by the First World War and the eminently adaptable Lee–Enfield served for another half century.

In British service the Lee–Metford was also upgraded to the standards of later rifle patterns (e.g. to charger loading and Short Rifle, the SMLE pattern), though the barrel was almost always switched to one with Enfield pattern rifling. The Lee–Metford was produced commercially and used by civilian target shooters until the outbreak of World War I, as it was considered to be inherently more accurate than the Enfield pattern of rifling. In this context, barrels and boltheads could be replaced as frequently as the owner wished, or could afford. It remained a reserve arm in many parts of the British Empire into WWII, even being issued to the New Zealand Home Guard and the Australian Volunteer Defence Corps until more modern rifles could be obtained. The Lee–Metford is still in ceremonial use with the Atholl Highlanders.

Charlton Automatic Rifle

Small numbers of Lee–Metford rifles were  built as, or converted to, experimental semi-automatic loading systems, such as the British Howell and South African Reider and the best-known of which was the Charlton Automatic Rifle, designed by a New Zealander, Philip Charlton in 1941 to act as a substitute for the Bren and Lewis gun light machine guns which were in chronically short supply at the time. During the Second World War, the majority of New Zealand's land forces were deployed in North Africa.  When Japan entered the war in 1941, New Zealand found itself lacking the light machine guns that would be required for local defence should Japan choose to invade, and so the New Zealand Government funded the development of self-loading conversions for the Lee–Metford rifle. The end result was the Charlton Automatic Rifle (based on the obsolete MLE), which was issued to Home Guard units in NZ from 1942. Over 1,500 conversions were made, including a handful by the Australian firm Electrolux using Lithgow SMLE Mk III* rifles.

The two Charlton designs differed markedly in external appearance (amongst other things, the New Zealand Charlton had a forward pistol grip and bipod, whilst the Australian one did not), but shared the same operating mechanism. Most of the Charlton Automatic Rifles were destroyed in a fire after the Second World War, but a few examples survive in museums and private collections.

Users

: 3000 were brought into the country by liberal rebels in 1904. Also in service during the Chaco War

: At the beginning of the 20th century, copies were made in local arsenals by Indian gunsmiths. In 1914, 5000 surplus British rifles were bought
: Still in use with the Atholl Highlanders for ceremonial purposes

See also
British military rifles
M1895 Lee Navy
M1885 Remington-Lee

References

Citations

Sources

 Skennerton, Ian: Small Arms Identification Series No. 7: .303 Magazine Lee-Metford and Magazine Lee-Enfield. Arms & Militaria Press, Gold Coast QLD (Australia), 1997. .

External links

Early rifles
Police weapons
Bolt-action rifles of the United Kingdom
Victorian-era weapons of the United Kingdom